Pat Jackson (8 December 1924 – 6 September 1974) was an English footballer, who played as an inside forward in the Football League for Tranmere Rovers.

References

External links

Tranmere Rovers F.C. players
1974 deaths
Swindon Town F.C. players
Association football inside forwards
English Football League players
1924 births
Footballers from Liverpool
English footballers